Roy McGowan (born 21 November 1939) is an Irish sports shooter. He competed in the mixed trap event at the 1984 Summer Olympics.

References

External links
 

1939 births
Living people
Irish male sport shooters
Olympic shooters of Ireland
Shooters at the 1984 Summer Olympics
People from Newtownards
20th-century Irish people